The following is a timeline of the history of the city of Colorado Springs, Colorado, USA.

19th century
 1871 - Colorado Springs Company founded by William Jackson Palmer.
 1872
 Town incorporated.
 Out West newspaper begins publication.
 1873 - Town becomes seat of El Paso County.
 1874
 Colorado College and Colorado School for Deaf Mutes  established.
 Grasshopper plague.
 Jackson house (residence) built.
 Evergreen Cemetery in use.
 1875 - El Paso County Library (social library) active.
 1876 - Town becomes part of the new State of Colorado.
1880 - Four chalybeate mineral springs (iron salts and other minerals) were discovered along Monument Creek in October 1880 by Dr. Charles Gatchell.
 1882 - Antlers Hotel in business.
 1885 - Colorado Midland Railway in operation.
 1890
 Alamo Hotel built.
 Free Library and Reading Room Association established.
 1891
 Gold found in nearby Cripple Creek.
 Pikes Peak cog railway and St. Mary's Church built.
 1892 - Pike National Forest established near Colorado Springs.
 1893 - High School Building opens.
 1899 - Van Briggle Art Pottery founded.
 1899 - Tesla Experimental laboratory built on knob hill

20th century
 1901 - Colorado Springs and Cripple Creek District Railway begins operating.
 1903 - El Paso County Courthouse building constructed.
 1904 - Colorado Springs City Hall built.
 1905
 Colorado Springs Public Library-Carnegie Building opens.
 Henry Clay Hall becomes mayor.
 1906 - Sons of the American Revolution chapter organized.
 1907 - Monument Valley Park developed.
 1909 - Garden of the Gods park established.
 1910
 St. Stephen's School and Colorado Springs Light, Heat and Power Company established.
 Population: 29,078.
 1913 - Harry H. Seldomridge becomes U.S. representative for Colorado's 2nd congressional district.
 1917 - Colorado City becomes part of Colorado Springs.
 1918 - Broadmoor Hotel in business.
 1919 - Broadmoor Art Academy founded.
 1920 - Blair's Business College established.
 1923 - Colorado Springs Municipal Auditorium and Cottonwood Creek Bridge built.
 1925 - Alexander Airport built.
 1926
 National Methodist Sanitorium opens.
 New pavilion at Tahama Spring is constructed.
 1928 - Alexander Film Company relocates to Colorado Springs.
 1935 - Peak Theatre opens.
 1936 - Colorado Springs Fine Arts Center built.
 1937
 Pikes Peak or Bust Rodeo begins.
 Colorado Springs Museum established.
 1938 - Broadmoor Ice Palace (skating rink) opens.
 1940 - Population: 33,237.
 1941 - U.S. military Camp Carson established.
 1946 - Colorado Springs Gazette-Telegraph newspaper in publication.
 1948 - Peterson Field established.
 1949 - Pikes Peak Range Riders active.
 1953 - Pikes Peak Ghost Town in business.
 1956 - Santa's Workshop opens near city.
 1957 - North American Aerospace Defense Command established.
 1958 - United States Air Force Academy established near city.
 1962 - United States Air Force Academy Cadet Chapel built.
 1964 - Cheyenne Mountain nuclear bunker built near city.
 1965 - Colorado Technical College and University of Colorado, Colorado Springs established.
 1967 - Pikes Peak Community College established.
 1970
 Colorado Springs Sun newspaper begins publication.
 Population: 135,060.
 1974 - Care and Share food bank incorporated.
 1975
 Peterson U.S. Air Force Base active.
 Larry Ochs becomes mayor.
 1978
 United States Olympic Training Center opens.
 National Sports Festival held.
 1979
 Professional Rodeo Cowboys Association headquartered in city.
 Bob Isaac becomes mayor.
 Professional Rodeo Hall of Champs and Colorado Springs Pioneers Museum open.
 1980 - Pikes Peak Genealogical Society founded.
 1982
 Colorado Springs' annexation of Broadmoor, Cheyenne Canon, Ivywild, Skyway, and Stratton Meadows neighborhoods is upheld by the Colorado Supreme Court after a district court had voided the annexation.
 Pikes Peak Center built.
 1983 - Catholic Diocese of Colorado Springs established.
 1985 - Falcon U.S. Air Force Station in operation.
 1988 - Rocky Mountain Women's Film Festival begins.
 1990
 Norwest Bank Tower built.
 Population: 281,140; metro 397,014.
 1992 - Earth Spirit Pagans and Citizens Project established.
 1993 - Focus on the Family relocates headquarters from Pomona, California.
 1994 - ADX Florence federal supermax prison begins operating in vicinity of Colorado Springs.
 1997 - Mary Lou Makepeace becomes mayor.
 1998 - World Arena, Colorado Springs opens.
 2000
 Pikes Peak Greenway opens.
 Population: 360,890.
 Prominent gays in the military story published about closeted soldiers here. Part 2.

21st century
 2003
 Colorado Springs Philharmonic Orchestra and Red Rock Canyon Open Space established.
 Lionel Rivera becomes mayor.
 2006
 First marijuana dispensary in state, Cannabis Therapeutics opens to the public
 2007
 January: Doug Lamborn becomes U.S. representative for Colorado's 5th congressional district.
 December 9: The Colorado YWAM and New Life shootings occur.
 2008 - Hollywood Theaters (cinema) in business.
 2010 - Population: 416,427.
 July 1, 2010 - 230 medical marijuana related-businesses with active sales tax licenses meet registration deadline and are allowed to continue operating.
 2011 - Steve Bach becomes mayor.
 2012 - June 23: The Waldo Canyon fire begins.
 2013
 June 11: Black Forest Fire begins near city.
 November 5: While approved by 49.3% of county residents in the 2012 election, city officials continue to refuse to allow any recreational marijuana dispensaries to open.
 2015
 The October 2015 Colorado Springs shooting occurs.
 The Colorado Springs Planned Parenthood shooting occurs.
 2021 - The 2021 Colorado Springs shooting occurs.
 2022 - The Colorado Springs nightclub shooting occurs.

See also
 Timeline of Colorado history
 Timelines of other cities in Colorado: Aurora, Boulder, Denver

References

Bibliography

External links

 
 Items related to Colorado Springs, various dates (via Digital Public Library of America)

Colorado Springs
 
Colorado Springs